The Royal Air Force Museum is a museum dedicated to the Royal Air Force in the United Kingdom. The museum is a non-departmental public body of the Ministry of Defence and is a registered charity.

The museum is split into two separate sites:

 Royal Air Force Museum London, opened 1972
 Royal Air Force Museum Cosford, opened 1979

See also
 Simon Greenish, former Director of Collections
 Maggie Appleton, CEO

References

External links
 Official website

Ministry of Defence (United Kingdom)
Non-departmental public bodies of the United Kingdom government
Air force museums in the United Kingdom